Löwen, literally meaning "lions", may refer to:

Places

Sports
Frankfurter Löwen, a defunct American football club from Frankfurt, Germany
Rhein-Neckar Löwen, a European handball club from Mannheim, Germany
Basketball Löwen Braunschweig, a basketball club from Braunschweig, Germany

People with the surname
Albert von Löwen (1166-1192), saint
Eva Helena Löwen (1743-1813), Swedish noble socialite 
Fredrique Löwen (1760–1813), Swedish actress

See also
Loewen, a surname
Löwenbräu
Löwenwolde (disambiguation)